Kassel Hauptbahnhof is a Deutsche Bahn railway station in the city of Kassel, in the German state of Hesse. Situated in the central borough of Mitte, it is the city's second important railway station after the opening of Kassel-Wilhelmshöhe in 1991; and so it is the only Hauptbahnhof that is not the main station of its city.

History

Early history
Construction of the station building, projected by Gottlob Engelhard, started in a period between 1851 and 1856. The style of the original building, bombed during World War II, was romantic neoclassical. The reconstruction, started in 1952, was completed in 1960 by the architect Friedrich Bätjer with the style of 1950s maintaining some original elements.

Recent history
When the Deutsche Bundesbahn began constructing the Hanover–Würzburg high-speed railway, Kassel originally was not supposed to have a station on the line at all. When it was decided to connect the city, Kassel posed a unique problem, Kassel was a terminal station. Options were discussed, among them the remodeling of Kassel's main station and the construction of an entirely new station. On 13 November 1981 construction of the high speed rail line started on Hesse territory, and it was decided to erect the new main station in the Kassel borough of Bad Wilhelmshöhe, opened on May 29, 1991.

In 1995  the station was thoroughly renovated and conceived (so far uniquely) as a Kulturbahnhof (cultural station). Thus emerged – in addition to art galleries, an architecture center and restaurants – an exhibition space for comic arts, the Caricatura museum  and two repertory cinemas.

Train services
The following services currently call at the station:

Regional services  Kassel - Wabern - Treysa - Marburg - Gießen - Frankfurt
Local services  Fuldatalbahn Kassel - Melsungen - Bebra - Fulda
Local services  Göttingen - Eichenberg - Kassel
Tram-train services  Hofgeismar-Hümme - Kassel - City Centre - Hollandische Straße
Tram-train services  Wolfhagen - Zierenberg - Kassel - City Centre - Hollandische Straße
Tram-train services  Melsungen - Kassel - City Centre - Auestadion

Structure and transport
Kassel Hauptbahnhof is a terminal station with 8 tracks and other 3 in the tunnel station for the RegioTram (a sort of Stadtbahn). The station is served by several lines of the tramway network, RegioTram and buses.

Due to its central position in the city it is a busy station, terminal of several regional DB lines:
Frederick William Northern Railway to Bebra and Frankfurt–Bebra line to Fulda,
Halle–Kassel line to Eichenberg and Bebra–Göttingen line to Göttingen,
Halle–Kassel line to Halle,
Frederick William Northern Railway to Bebra and Thuringian Railway to Erfurt,
Main-Weser line to Frankfurt,
Kassel–Warburg railway to Warburg and Upper Ruhr Valley Railway to Hagen,
Volkmarsen–Vellmar-Obervellmar line to Volkmarsen and Warburg–Sarnau line to Korbach and
Edersee Railway to Bad Wildungen.

Gallery

See also
Kassel-Wilhelmshöhe
List of railway stations in Hesse

References

External links

 Kulturbahnhof Kassel official site

Railway stations in North Hesse
Buildings and structures in Kassel
Railway stations in Germany opened in 1856